The year 2007 is the seventh year in the history of Deep, a mixed martial arts promotion based in Japan. In 2007 Deep held 22 events beginning with, Deep: 28 Impact.

Title fights

Events list

Deep: 28 Impact

Deep: 28 Impact was an event held on February 16, 2007 at Korakuen Hall in Tokyo.

Results

Deep: 29 Impact

Deep: 29 Impact was an event held on April 13, 2007 at Korakuen Hall in Tokyo.

Results

Deep: clubDeep Toyama: Barbarian Festival 6

Deep: clubDeep Toyama: Barbarian Festival 6 was an event held on May 13, 2007 at Toyama Event Plaza in Toyama.

Results

Deep: 1st Amateur Impact

Deep: 1st Amateur Impact was an event held on May 27, 2007 at Mach Dojo in Ryugasaki.

Results

Deep: clubDeep Nagoya: MB3z Impact, Power of a Dream

Deep: clubDeep Nagoya: MB3z Impact, Power of a Dream was an event held on June 10, 2007 at Zepp Nagoya in Nagoya.

Results

Deep: clubDeep Tokyo

Deep: clubDeep Tokyo was an event held on June 16, 2007 at Shinjuku Face in Tokyo.

Results

Deep: Oyaji Deep

Deep: Oyaji Deep was an event held on June 16, 2007 at Shinjuku Face in Tokyo.

Results

Deep: Deep in Yamagata

Deep: Deep in Yamagata was an event held on June 24, 2007 at Mikawa Town Gymnasium in Mikawa.

Results

Deep: 30 Impact

Deep: 30 Impact was an event held on July 8, 2007 at Zepp Osaka in Osaka.

Results

Deep: CMA Festival 2

Deep: CMA Festival 2 was an event held on July 23, 2007 at Korakuen Hall in Tokyo.

Results

Deep: Glove

Deep: Glove was an event held on February 5, 2007 at Korakuen Hall in Tokyo.

Results

Deep: 31 Impact

Deep: 31 Impact was an event held on August 5, 2007 at Korakuen Hall in Tokyo.

Results

Deep: clubDeep Tokyo

Deep: clubDeep Tokyo was an event held on September 15, 2007 at Shinjuku Face in Tokyo.

Results

Deep: clubDeep Yamaguchi

Deep: clubDeep Yamaguchi was an event held on September 23, 2007 at Shinnanyo Gymnasium in Shinnan'yo.

Results

Deep: 32 Impact

Deep: 32 Impact was an event held on October 9, 2007 at Korakuen Hall in Tokyo.

Results

Deep: clubDeep Osaka

Deep: clubDeep Osaka was an event held on October 13, 2007 at Azalea Taisho Hall in Osaka.

Results

Deep: clubDeep Hamamatsu

Deep: clubDeep Hamamatsu was an event held on October 21, 2007 at Act City in Hamamatsu.

Results

Deep: clubDeep Sendai

Deep: clubDeep Sendai was an event held on October 28, 2007 at Zepp Sendai in Sendai.

Results

Deep: Kobudo Fight 1

Deep: Kobudo Fight 1 was an event held on November 3, 2007 at Kobudo Martial Arts Communication Space Tiger Hall in Nagoya.

Results

Deep: clubDeep Kanazawa

Deep: clubDeep Kanazawa was an event held on December 9, 2007 at Ishikawa Industrial Pavilion Second Hall in Kanazawa.

Results

Deep: 33 Impact

Deep: 33 Impact was an event held on December 12, 2007 at Korakuen Hall in Tokyo.

Results

Deep: Protect Impact 2007

Deep: Protect Impact 2007 was an event held on December 22, 2007 at Umeda Stella Hall in Osaka.

Results

See also 
 List of Deep champions
 List of Deep events

References

Deep (mixed martial arts) events
2007 in mixed martial arts